Cora Juanita Brewer Martin-Moore (1927–2005) was a gospel singer. She was a soloist in the Sallie Martin Singers and the director of the Echoes of Eden Choir. She also had her own music publishing company.

Biography
Martin-Moore was born in Chicago in 1927. In Chicago she was a member of the Mount Pleasant Baptist Church. Her birth parents were Lucius and Annie Moore, but she was adopted at an early age by the gospel singer, Sallie Martin. She joined the Sallie Martin Singers as a teenager, subsequently moving to Los Angeles where she became a member of the St. Paul Baptist Church and attended California State University, Dominguez Hills. She was known for her renditions of Eyes Hath Not Seen and He'll Wash You Whiter than Snow.

Martin-Moore wrote several songs, many were published by her own music publishing company.

In 1958 Martin-Moore became the director of the Echoes of Eden Choir in Los Angeles.

Martin-Moore died in 2005.

Legacy
In 2018 Martin-Moore was included in the exhibition "How Sweet the Sound: Gospel Music in Los Angeles" at the California African American Museum.

References

1927 births
2005 deaths
20th-century African-American women singers
American women singers
American gospel singers
20th-century American people
21st-century African-American people
21st-century African-American women